Bobby Coffman (born February 17, 1951) is an American former track and field athlete who competed in the decathlon. He set his personal record of 8274 points in Quebec City on August 12, 1979.

Coffman competed at two major international events and won gold in both. He first took the decathlon title at the 1979 Pan American Games with a championship record total of 8078 points. The following year he qualified for the 1980 U.S. Olympic team but was unable to compete due to the 1980 Summer Olympics boycott. He did however receive one of 461 Congressional Gold Medals created especially for the spurned athletes. and was the winner of the Olympic boycott games known as the Liberty Bell Classic with a score of 8058 points.

At national level he won at the USA Outdoor Track and Field Championships in both 1979 and 1980, having placed fifth earlier in his career in 1975.

International competitions

National titles
USA Outdoor Track and Field Championships
Decathlon: 1979, 1980

See also
List of decathlon national champions (men)

References



Living people
1951 births
American male decathletes
Pan American Games gold medalists for the United States
Pan American Games medalists in athletics (track and field)
Athletes (track and field) at the 1979 Pan American Games
Medalists at the 1979 Pan American Games